Haql El Aazimeh     is a Lebanese village, located in the Miniyeh-Danniyeh District. It had 1,253 eligible voters in the 2009 elections, and the residents belonged to the  Greek Orthodox Church.

History
In 1838, Eli Smith noted  the village as Hakl el-'Azimeh,  located in the Ed-Dunniyeh area. The inhabitants were  Greek Orthodox  Christians.

References

Bibliography

External links
Haql El Aazimeh, Localiban

Populated places in Miniyeh-Danniyeh District
Populated places in Lebanon
Eastern Orthodox Christian communities in Lebanon